All About a Feeling is the third studio album released by American country artist Donna Fargo. The album was released in October 1973 on Dot Records and was produced by Fargo's husband and manager Stan Silver. It was Donna Fargo's second studio released in 1973 and spawned two Top 10 hits on the Billboard country chart between 1973 and 1974. It was Fargo's first studio album not to chart among the Billboard 200 albums list.

Background and content 
All About a Feeling was recorded in two sessions between November 1972 and March 1973, both at the Jack Clement Recording Studio in Nashville, Tennessee, United States. The session in November 1972 produced the songs "I'll Try a Little Bit Harder" and "Just Call Me". The session in March 1973 produced the rest of the album's material. All About a Feeling consisted of eleven tracks, all of which were written entirely by Fargo. This was unlike any of Fargo's previous releases, which contained either one or two tracks not written by Fargo herself. The opening track entitled "It Do Feel Good" would later become a Top 10 hit when it was featured on her 1974 release, Miss Donna Fargo.

All About a Feeling was originally released on an LP record, containing six songs on the A side of the record and five songs on the B side of the record. The album has never be reissued on a compact disc since its original 1973 release.

Release 
All About a Feeling'''s sixth track entitled "Little Girl Gone" was released as the lead single from the album in September 1973. The single became Fargo's first major hit not to reach number one, but instead peak at #2 on the Billboard Magazine Hot Country Singles chart, #57 on the Billboard Hot 100, and #43 on the Hot Adult Contemporary Tracks chart. In Canada, the single peaked at #2 on the RPM Country Singles chart and #55 on the RPM Adult Contemporary Singles chart. "I'll Try a Little Bit Harder" was spawned as the album's second and final single in January 1974, which peaked at #6 on the Billboard Magazine Hot Country Singles list. All About a Feeling was released in October 1973 on Dot Records and peaked at #5 on the Billboard Magazine Top Country Albums chart. It became Fargo's first album not to chart the Billboard 200 albums list.Allmusic retrospectively reviewed All About a Feeling'' and gave it three out of five stars, stating, "Fargo's brand of upbeat and accessible country is the sort of music that brought the genre such tremendous mainstream success from the '70s onward."

Track listing 
All songs composed by Donna Fargo.

Side one
 "It Do Feel Good" – 2:49
 "I'll Try a Little Bit Harder" – 3:06
 "Puffy Eyes" – 2:51
 "Nothing Can Stay" – 2:22
 "All About a Feeling" – 2:28

Side two
 "Little Girl Gone" – 2:28
 "Just Call Me" – 2:24
 "Hot Diggety Dog" – 2:19
 "Does It Matter" – 2:09
 "Rotten Little Song" – 2:00
 "Just a Friend of Mine" – 2:21

Personnel 
 Willie Ackerman – drums
 Harold Bradley – bass guitar
 Larry Butler – piano
 Jimmy Capps – guitar
 Jerry Carrigan – drums
 Buzz Cason – background vocals
 Pete Drake – steel guitar
 Ray Edenton – rhythm guitar
 Donna Fargo – lead vocals
 Johnny Gimble – fiddle
 Buddy Harman – drums
 Lloyd Green – dobro, steel guitar
 The Sheldon Kurland Strings – strings
 Charlie McCoy – harmonica, vibes
 Bob Moore – bass
 Farrell Morris – percussion
 Leon Rhodes – bass guitar
 Hargus "Pig" Robbins – piano
 Billy Sanford – guitar
 Buddy Spicher – fiddle
 Wendy Suits – background vocals
 Shirley Temple Choir – background vocals
 Diane Tidwell – background vocals
 Bobby Thompson – banjo
 Bergen White – background vocals

Sales chart positions 
Album

Singles

References 

1973 albums
Donna Fargo albums
Dot Records albums